This list of people in Playboy 1960–1969 is a catalog of women and men who appeared in Playboy magazine in the years 1960 through 1969. Not all of the people featured in the magazine are pictured in the nude.

While every month included a centerfold, interviews and cover models did not become an almost-regular feature until autumn 1962. The interviews would occasionally be replaced by panel discussions such as the two-part "Panel on 1984 and Beyond" published in 1963.

Entries in blue indicate that the issue marks the original appearance of that year's Playmate of the Year (PMOY).

1960

1961

1962

1963

1964

1965

1966

1967

1968

1969

See also
 List of people in Playboy 1953–1959
 List of people in Playboy 1970–1979
 List of people in Playboy 1980–1989
 List of people in Playboy 1990–1999
 List of people in Playboy 2000–2009
 List of people in Playboy 2010–2020

Playboy lists
Playboy 1960-1969
Playboy 1960-1969
Playboy